Lawrence Harvey (born 29 January 1973) is an English-born former international footballer for the Turks and Caicos Islands national football team.

Harvey was eligible to play for Turks and Caicos Islands as FIFA eligibility rules permit British passport holders to represent British Overseas Territories at international football in FIFA-recognised matches following two years residency. He fulfills the criteria having once worked in TCI as a quantity surveyor.

International career
He made two appearances for the Turks and Caicos Islands national football team in February 2004, both games were part of the 2006 FIFA World Cup qualification phase. The matches took place in Florida and were against Haiti, the matches ended with 5-0 and 2-0 victories in Haiti's favour. At the time of Harvey's call-up, he was playing in the Halls of Cambridge Sunday League for amateur team Alcia Athletic in England and working professionally as a quantity surveyor in Burwell near Cambridge.

References

1972 births
Living people
English expatriate sportspeople in the Turks and Caicos Islands
Association football defenders
Turks and Caicos Islands footballers
Turks and Caicos Islands international footballers
KPMG United FC players
English footballers
English expatriate footballers
Expatriate footballers in the Turks and Caicos Islands